Mazru (also Romanized as Mazrū, Mazroo, and Mazrow; also known as Marrū) is a village in Alaviyeh Rural District, Kordian District, Jahrom County, Fars Province, Iran. At the 2006 census, its population was 41, in 5 families.

References 

Populated places in Jahrom County